Book History is the official publication of the Society for the History of Authorship, Reading and Publishing. It was established in 1998 and is published annually by the Johns Hopkins University Press.

Book History is an academic journal devoted to  the history of the book, i.e. the history of the creation, dissemination and reception of script and printed materials. It publishes research on the social, economic and cultural history of authorship, editing, printing, the book arts, publishing and the book trade, periodicals, newspapers, ephemera, copyright, censorship, literary agents, libraries, literary criticism, canon formation, literacy, literary education, reading habits, and reader response.

See also
History of books

External links
 
 Book History on the Johns Hopkins University Press website
 Book History at Project MUSE
 Society for the History of Authorship, Reading and Publishing

History journals
Johns Hopkins University Press academic journals
English-language journals
Publications established in 1998
History of books